It's Not a Dream is the first single by Irish singer–songwriter Sharon Corr, taken from her debut solo album Dream of You.

On 15 July, Sharon appeared on television show This Morning, having been booked by host Phillip Schofield via Twitter to confirm the release of a solo album and single.

Corr has been promoting the single with appearances at the Isle of Wight Festival, Glastonbury, and a number of other European summer festivals.

According to Sharon Corr's official website, within hours the song broke into the top 100 on iTunes through digital downloads.

Track listing
"It's Not a Dream" – 4:07

Charts

Release history

References

2009 debut singles
Irish pop songs
Songs written by Sharon Corr
2009 songs